Kattiganapalli is a census town in Krishnagiri district in the Indian state of Tamil Nadu.It is suburb of Krishnagiri city.

Demographics
 India census, Kattiganapalli had a population of 15,488. Males constitute 51% of the population and females 49%. Kattiganapalli has an average literacy rate of 73%, higher than the national average of 59.5%: male literacy is 79%, and female literacy is 66%. In Kattigaanapalli, 12% of the population is under 6 years of age.

References

Villages in Krishnagiri district